Poshak is the Hindi term used for the complete attire used in the vedic period. As mentioned in Sanskrit literature and Buddhist Pali literature during the 6th century BC, the costumes belonging to the Vedic and post-Vedic period 1500 BCE to 350 BCE consisted of the antariya, which is the lower garment, the uttariya, which is a veil worn over the shoulder or the head, and the stanapatta, which is a chest band. The modernday Sari is one of the evolved poshak earlier known as Sattika (which means women's attire) that was single garment to wrap around the waist and cover the head.

Meaning 
Poshak means a specific type of costume in English. Vasna or Vastar (means dress) has two main categories vasa for lower, and Adhivasa for upper body parts, other related terms of garb used in Vedas are as following.

 Suvasa was the term for a splendid garment
 Suvasna for well clad 
 Surabhi for well fitting clothes.

Types and styles 
 Poshak, pridhaan was a set of clothes for men and women. These clothes were common and unsewn but varied with the size and style of wrapping and draping. They have various descriptions of associated ensembles in Vedas, such as for the characters in the Ramayana and the Mahabharata. Sari, is significantly stated in the Hindu epic Mahabharata, the war took place in 3067 BCE.

Forms 
 
 Uttariya is an upper body garment.
 Adivasah is a loose-fitting outer garment, it is a type of over garment similar to a mantle or cloak
 Antariya is a lower body garment.
 Stanapatta is a chest band to cover the breasts.
 Sari

Bhesha 
Suna Besha is an event at the Jagannath Temple, Puri, where the Hindu deities Shri Jagannath ji, Balabhadra, and Subhadra are adorned with poshak variety of jewelry. The rituals are similar in many other Hindu temples where the devotees offer Poshak to the deities as a part of their prayers.

Different costumes of Vedic culture 
Following sculptures in the Indian subcontinent, terracottas, cave paintings, and wood carvings conferring men and women wore the same (unstitched) clothes with various wrapping and draping styles.

Poetic references 
Silapadikkaram indicate that during the Sangam period (third-century BCE to fourth-century CE in ancient South India), a single piece of clothing served as both lower and upper.

Evolution 
With changing times, social norms and the introduction of sewing developed the wraps into many attractive costumes. Uttariya became dupatta, Antriya changed into the skirt (ghagra), and stanapatta became choli. Sari, of course, is evolved from these articles.

See also 

 Kanchuka, the foremost recorded bodice used in India.
 History of clothing in the Indian subcontinent
 Vedas, ancient scriptures of Hinduism.

References 

Hindu religious clothing
Indian clothing